The Chase Heat are a junior 'B' ice hockey team based in Chase, British Columbia, Canada. They are members of the Doug Birks Division of the Okanagan/Shuswap Conference of the Kootenay International Junior Hockey League (KIJHL). The Heat play their home games at the Art Holding Memorial Arena. Darryl Adamson is the team's president, Brad Fox is the general manager and the coach.

The Heat joined the league in 2011 as an expansion team.

History

The 2011-12 Chase Heat entered their first season as a member of the Kootenay International Junior Hockey League (KIJHL), as an expansion team. Before the Heat, Chase also had a KIJHL team named the Chase Chiefs, before relocating to Kelowna, British Columbia prior to the 2010–11 KIJHL season to become the Kelowna Chiefs.

The 2016-17 season saw the Heat earn their first Doug Birks Division title.

Season-by-season record

Note: GP = Games played, W = Wins, L = Losses, T = Ties, OTL = Overtime Losses, Pts = Points, GF = Goals for, GA = Goals against

Records as of February 27, 2023.

Playoffs

References

External links
Official website of the Chase Heat

Ice hockey teams in British Columbia
2011 establishments in British Columbia
Ice hockey clubs established in 2011